The Chicago Street Course is a  street circuit in the city of Chicago, Illinois, United States that will host the NASCAR Cup Series and NASCAR Xfinity Series on July 1–2, 2023. The track was initially a conceptual track on iRacing made for the eNASCAR iRacing Pro Invitational Series in 2021.

Background/history
On March 24, 2021, NASCAR announced that an imaginary street course in the Chicago Loop in Downtown Chicago would be the track for the fifth (and what turned out to be the final) race of the 2021 eNASCAR iRacing Pro Invitational Series. The iRacing event was broadcast live on NASCAR on Fox on Wednesday, June 2. Ever since then, there had been rumors and speculation that NASCAR would like to make this track a reality and have a street race in Chicago on the Cup Series schedule in the future.

On June 17, Adam Stern from Sports Business Journal suggested that the Chicago Street Course could replace Road America on the 2023 NASCAR Cup Series schedule, as the street race would likely replace one of the road course races and Road America did not have a contract to have a Cup Series race in 2023. On July 7, 2022, Jordan Bianchi from The Athletic reported that an official announcement of a Chicago street race being added to the Cup Series schedule would come on July 19. On July 19, the official announcement of the addition of the Chicago Street Race to the Cup Series schedule took place. and the fact that it would replace the race at Road America on it. The circuit will also host a round for the Xfinity Series along with the Cup Series.

Track layout
The track for the actual race in 2023 ended up being the exact same layout as the version used in 2021 for the eNASCAR iRacing Pro Invitational Series. The start/finish line is located on South Columbus Drive in front of Buckingham Fountain in Grant Park. The cars will go south and then turn left onto East Balbo Drive and then right onto South Lake Shore Drive (also part of U.S. Route 41), which is alongside Lake Michigan. The cars will then turn right onto East Roosevelt Road and then make another right, which gets them back onto South Columbus Drive where they are going north. They will then reach the intersection of South Columbus Drive and East Balbo Drive again and will make a left turn. When they are back on East Balbo Drive, they will cross a bridge over the Metra Electric District tracks. Next, the cars will turn right onto South Michigan Avenue and go north, go onto East Congress Plaza Drive and back onto South Michigan Ave. Lastly, they will make a right turn onto East Jackson Drive, go back across the Metra Electric tracks, and right back onto South Columbus Drive to the start/finish line.

References

2023 establishments in the United States
Motorsport venues in Illinois
NASCAR tracks
Sports venues in Chicago